Esma Agolli (1 July 1928 – 5 June 2010) was an Albanian actress. She received the title of Merited Artist of Albania and acted in 60 different roles, her first one in 1948.

Death 
Agolli died of cardiac arrest.

Filmography (selection) 
 Ne shtepine tone (1979)
 Mysafiri  (1979) – Agathia
 Përtej mureve të gurta (1979) – Zonja Neriman
 Fëmijët e saj (1957) – Nusja
 Tana (1958)

References

External links

1928 births
2010 deaths
People from Tirana
Merited Artists of Albania
Albanian actresses
Albanian stage actresses
Albanian film actresses
20th-century Albanian actresses